Donald Elmer Black (September 21, 1891 – April 15, 1980) was a Quebec-born politician, farmer and merchant. He was elected to the House of Commons of Canada in 1935 as Member of the Liberal Party to represent the riding of Châteauguay—Huntingdon and re-elected in 1940 and 1945. He was re-elected to represent Châteauguay—Huntingdon—Laprairie in 1949.

External links
 

1890s births
Liberal Party of Canada MPs
Members of the House of Commons of Canada from Quebec
People from Montérégie
1980 deaths
Anglophone Quebec people